Abha Maiti (22 April 1925 - 3 July 1994) was a former Indian politician. She was the minister of state for industry in the Morarji Desai government from 1977 to 1979.

Early life  
She was educated at Bethune College.

Career 
She was born in 1925 to Ahalya and Nikunja Behari Maiti, a politician. She obtained B.A. and LL.B. degrees from University of Calcutta. 

She was elected to the West Bengal Legislative Assembly from Khejuri (Vidhan Sabha constituency) in 1951 and from Bhagabanpur (Vidhan Sabha constituency) in 1962, 1967 and 1969. Between 1960 and 1962, Maiti was a member of the Rajya Sabha.

She was elected to Lok Sabha in 1977 from Panskura in West Bengal on the Janata Party ticket.

References

External links 
Abha Maiti profile

People from Paschim Medinipur district
1925 births
India MPs 1977–1979
Bethune College alumni
University of Calcutta alumni
Lok Sabha members from West Bengal
West Bengal MLAs 1951–1957
West Bengal MLAs 1962–1967
West Bengal MLAs 1967–1969
Rajya Sabha members from West Bengal
Bharatiya Lok Dal politicians
Indian National Congress politicians
Janata Party politicians
1994 deaths
Indian National Congress (Organisation) politicians